Sarrazac may refer to:

Sarrazac, Dordogne, a commune in the Dordogne department, France
Sarrazac, Lot, a former commune in the Lot department, France
Jean-Pierre Sarrazac (born 1946), a French playwright, stage director, and teacher

See also